Wie's Bang is Van Coke Kartel's third studio album. It was released in March 2010.

Track listing

References

Van Coke Kartel albums
2010 albums